In economics, the theory of rational inattention deals with the effects of the cost of information acquisition on decision making. For example, when the information required for a decision is costly to acquire, the decision makers may rationally take decisions based on incomplete information, rather than incurring the cost to get the complete information.

See also 
 Behavioral economics
 Christopher Sims
 Rationality
 Value of information

References

Economic theories
Decision-making